Radka Bednaříková (born 18 December 1990) is a Czech football goalkeeper, currently playing for Sigma Olomouc in the Czech Second Division.

She is a member of the Czech national team. She made her debut on 26 November 2010 in a match against Hungary.

References

1990 births
Living people
Czech women's footballers
Czech Republic women's international footballers
1. FC Slovácko (women) players
FC Baník Ostrava players
FC Zbrojovka Brno players
Women's association football goalkeepers
Czech Women's First League players